The following is an overview of 1956 in film, including significant events, a list of films released and notable births and deaths.

Top-grossing films (U.S.)

The top ten 1956 released films by box office gross in North America are as follows:

Events
 February 5 – First showing of documentary films by the Free Cinema movement, at the National Film Theatre, London.
 February 16 – Carousel is the first film released that was shot in CinemaScope 55.
 February 23 – Arthur B. Krim and Robert Benjamin acquire Mary Pickford's interest in United Artists for $3 million giving them full ownership of UA.
 February – Warner Bros. sells much of its pre-1950 library to Associated Artists Productions (a.a.p.); after a series of mergers the films return to WB 40 years later.
 February – Darryl F. Zanuck announces his resignation as head of production of 20th Century Fox after 20 years as the studio head.  He is later replaced by Buddy Adler.
 April 18 – Grace Kelly marries Prince Rainier III and becomes Princess consort of Monaco. She stops acting.  Her last feature film, High Society, is released in July.
 May 30 –  United Artists release Trapeze which becomes their highest-grosser until surpassed by Around the World in 80 Days the following year. 
 July – Harry and Albert Warner sell their stock in Warner Bros. Jack L. Warner retains his and becomes president.
 July 25 – The comedy partnership between Dean Martin and Jerry Lewis ends. Their last film together, Hollywood or Bust, is released later in the year.
 August 4 – The last film serial, Blazing the Overland Trail from Columbia Pictures, is released.
 October 5 – The Ten Commandments opens in cinemas.  It was the most expensive film of all time with a cost of $13 million and becomes one of the most successful and popular films of all time, currently ranking 6th on the list of all time moneymakers (when adjusted for inflation).  It was director Cecil B. DeMille's last film.
 October 17 – Mike Todd's Around the World in 80 Days is released and goes on to become United Artists' highest-grossing film.
 October 18 – Joseph Vogel becomes president of MGM.
 November 1 – The film Oklahoma!, released in 1955 to select cities in Todd-AO, now receives a U.S. national release in CinemaScope, since not all theatres are yet equipped for Todd-AO. To accomplish this, the film has actually been shot twice, rather than printing one version in two different film processes, as is later done.
 November 15 – Elvis Presley's first film, Love Me Tender, opens.
 November 28
And God Created Woman opens in France making Brigitte Bardot an international star.
It is announced that production head Dore Schary will leave MGM at the end of the year.
 December 14 – Dance with Me, Henry is the last film featuring the comedy duo Abbott and Costello.

Awards

Top ten money making stars

1956 film releases

January–March
January 1956
11 January
The Lieutenant Wore Skirts
12 January
Diane
26 January
Helen of Troy
29 January
Warning from Space (Japan)
February 1956
5 February
Invasion of the Body Snatchers
16 February
Carousel
25 February
The Lone Ranger
March 1956
3 March
Forbidden Planet
6 March
1984 (U.K.)
9 March
Come Next Spring
Meet Me in Las Vegas
10 March
Never Say Goodbye
21 March
Rock Around the Clock
23 March
Serenade
24 March
Raw Edge
25 March
Indestructible Man
World Without End
28 March
The Conqueror

April–June
April 1956
4 April
The Maverick Queen
6 April
Jubal
10 April
Seven Wonders of the World
11 April
Backlash
24 April
Our Miss Brooks
26 April
The Creature Walks Among Us
27 April
Godzilla, King of the Monsters!
May 1956
8 May
The Man in the Gray Flannel Suit
9 May
The Harder They Fall
15 May
Invitation to the Dance
26 May
The Searchers
30 May
Trapeze
While the City Sleeps
The Animal World
June 1956
1 June
The Man Who Knew Too Much
6 June
The Killing
10 June
Crime in the Streets
12 June
A Kiss Before Dying
13 June
Earth vs. the Flying Saucers
Star in the Dust
15 June
Gunslinger
20 June
Safari
21 June
 The Eddy Duchin Story
22 June
The Catered Affair
27 June
Moby Dick
29 June
The King and I

July–September
July 1956
6 July
The Fastest Gun Alive
12 July
Foreign Intrigue
15 July
It Conquered the World
17 July
High Society
18 July
Davy Crockett and the River Pirates
23 July
Dakota Incident
25 July
Pardners
29 July
Hold Back the Night
30 July
Run for the Sun
August 1956 
The Beast of Hollow Mountain
1 August
Autumn Leaves
17 August
A Cry in the Night
These Wilder Years
21 August
War and Peace
24 August
A Strange Adventure
26 August
The Swan
29 August
The First Traveling Saleslady
The Vagabond King
September 1956
12 September
The Bad Seed
15 September
Lust for Life
21 September
The Last Wagon
28 September
The Best Things in Life Are Free

October–December
October 1956
5 October
The Ten Commandments
17 October
Around the World in 80 Days
Attack
Julie
26 October
The Opposite Sex
31 October
Death of a Scoundrel
You Can't Run Away from It
November 1956
1 November
Naked Gun
The White Squaw
15 November
Love Me Tender
Gun the Man Down
18 November
Yield to the Night (U.K.)
24 November
 Giant
25 November
Friendly Persuasion
29 November
The Teahouse of the August Moon
December 1956
1 December
The Mole People
The Girl Can't Help It
Curucu, Beast of the Amazon
5 December
 Man Beast
6 December
Hollywood or Bust
Nightfall
12 December
Bundle of Joy
13 December
Anastasia
The Rainmaker
21 December
The King and Four Queens
25 December
Written on the Wind
26 December
 Rodan (Japan)
Zarak
29 December
Baby Doll
The Great Man

Notable films released in 1956
United States unless stated

#
7th Cavalry, starring Randolph Scott and Barbara Hale
23 Paces to Baker Street, starring Van Johnson and Vera Miles
1984, directed by Michael Anderson, starring Edmond O'Brien and Michael Redgrave – (GB)

A
Accused of Murder, starring Vera Ralston
Alexander the Great, starring Richard Burton
Ali Baba and the 40 Thieves (Alibabavum 40 Thirudargalum) – (India)
The Ambassador's Daughter, starring Olivia de Havilland, Myrna Loy, John Forsythe
Anastasia, starring Ingrid Bergman and Yul Brynner
And God Created Woman, directed by Roger Vadim, starring Brigitte Bardot – (France)
Aparajito (The Unvanquished), directed by Satyajit Ray – (India)
Around the World in 80 Days, directed by Michael Anderson, starring David Niven, Cantinflas, Shirley MacLaine – Academy Award for Best Picture
At Gunpoint, starring Fred MacMurray, Walter Brennan, Dorothy Malone
Attack, a.k.a. Attack!, directed by Robert Aldrich, starring Jack Palance, Eddie Albert, Lee Marvin
Autumn Leaves, starring Joan Crawford and Cliff Robertson
Away All Boats, starring Jeff Chandler

B
Baby Doll, directed by Elia Kazan, starring Carroll Baker, Karl Malden, Eli Wallach
Back from Eternity, starring Robert Ryan, Anita Ekberg, Rod Steiger
Backlash, starring Richard Widmark and Donna Reed
The Bad Seed, starring Nancy Kelly and Patty McCormack
Bandido, starring Robert Mitchum
The Battle of the River Plate, a.k.a. Pursuit of the Graf Spee, written and directed by Powell and Pressburger, starring John Gregson and Peter Finch – (GB)
Before Sundown (Vor Sonnenuntergang) – (West Germany)
Behind the Headlines, starring Paul Carpenter and Hazel Court
The Benny Goodman Story, starring Steve Allen and Donna Reed
The Best Things in Life Are Free, starring Gordon MacRae, Dan Dailey, Sheree North
Between Heaven and Hell, directed by Richard Fleischer, starring Robert Wagner and Buddy Ebsen
Beyond a Reasonable Doubt, directed by Fritz Lang, starring Dana Andrews and Joan Fontaine
Bhowani Junction, starring Ava Gardner and Stewart Granger – (GB/United States)
Bigger Than Life, directed by Nicholas Ray, starring James Mason, Barbara Rush, Walter Matthau
The Birds and the Bees, starring George Gobel and Mitzi Gaynor
The Black Tent, directed by Brian Desmond Hurst, starring Donald Sinden, Anthony Steel, Anna Maria Sandri & André Morell – (U.K.)
Bob le flambeur (Bob the Gambler), directed by Jean-Pierre Melville – (France)
The Bold and the Brave, starring Wendell Corey and Mickey Rooney
The Boss, starring John Payne and Doe Avedon
The Bottom of the Bottle, directed by Henry Hathaway, starring Van Johnson, Joseph Cotten, Ruth Roman
The Brave One, directed by Irving Rapper
The Burmese Harp (Biruma no tategoto), directed by Kon Ichikawa – (Japan)
The Burning Hills, starring Natalie Wood and Tab Hunter
Bus Stop, starring Marilyn Monroe and Don Murray

C
C.I.D., starring Dev Anand – (India)
Calabuch (a.k.a. The Rocket from Calabuch), directed by Luis García Berlanga, starring Edmund Gwenn and Valentina Cortese – (Spain)
Calle Mayor (Main Street), directed by Juan Antonio Bardem, starring Betsy Blair – (Spain)
Carnival Night (Karnavalnaya noch) – (USSR)
Carousel, directed by Henry King, starring Shirley Jones and Gordon MacRae
The Case of the Mukkinese Battle Horn, comedy short starring Peter Sellers, Spike Milligan, Dick Emery – (GB)
The Catered Affair, starring Bette Davis, Ernest Borgnine, Debbie Reynolds
Checkpoint (1956 film), directed by Ralph Thomas, starring Anthony Steel, Odile Versois, Stanley Baker & James Robertson Justice – (U.K.)
Child of Sorrow (Anak dalita) – (Philippines)
Chori Chori, starring Nargis and Raj Kapoor – (India)
Comanche, starring Dana Andrews and Linda Cristal
Come Next Spring, starring Ann Sheridan and Steve Cochran
Congo Crossing, starring Virginia Mayo and Peter Lorre
The Conqueror, directed by Dick Powell, starring John Wayne (as Genghis Khan)
The Court Jester, starring Danny Kaye
Crazed Fruit (Kurutta kajitsu), directed by Kō Nakahira – (Japan)
Crime Against Joe, starring Julie London
Crime in the Streets, directed by Don Siegel, starring James Whitmore and John Cassavetes
A Cry in the Night, starring Edmond O'Brien, Natalie Wood, Raymond Burr

D
D-Day the Sixth of June, starring Robert Taylor
Dakota Incident, starring Dale Robertson
Dance with Me, Henry, starring Bud Abbott and Lou Costello
Death in the Garden (La mort en ce jardin), directed by Luis Buñuel, starring Simone Signoret and Charles Vanel – (France)
Death of a Scoundrel, starring George Sanders and Zsa Zsa Gabor
Diane, starring Lana Turner in her final MGM film after nearly 20 years with the studio
Donatella, directed by Mario Monicelli, starring Elsa Martinelli – (Italy)
Don't Look Back, My Son (Ne okreći se sine) – (Yugoslavia)
The Dragon (O Drakos) – (Greece)

E
Early Spring (Soshun), directed by Yasujirō Ozu – (Japan)
Earth vs. the Flying Saucers, starring Hugh Marlowe
The Eddy Duchin Story, starring Tyrone Power and Kim Novak
Elena and Her Men, starring Ingrid Bergman – (France/Italy)

F
The Fastest Gun Alive, starring Glenn Ford and Broderick Crawford
The First Texan, starring Joel McCrea
The First Traveling Saleslady, starring Ginger Rogers, Barry Nelson, Carol Channing
Forbidden Planet, starring Walter Pidgeon, Leslie Nielsen, Anne Francis
Forever, Darling, starring Desi Arnaz, Lucille Ball, James Mason
Friendly Persuasion, directed by William Wyler, starring Gary Cooper, Dorothy McGuire, Anthony Perkins
Funtoosh (Funny Man), starring Dev Anand – (India)

G
Gaby, starring Leslie Caron
Gervaise, directed by René Clément, starring Maria Schell – (France)
Giant, directed by George Stevens, starring Elizabeth Taylor, Rock Hudson and James Dean in his final film
The Girl Can't Help It, starring Tom Ewell and Jayne Mansfield in her first starring role
The Girl He Left Behind, starring Tab Hunter and Natalie Wood
A Girl in Black, directed by Michael Cacoyannis – winner of Golden Globe – (Greece)
Godzilla, King of the Monsters! directed by Terry Morse and Ishirō Honda, starring Raymond Burr and Takashi Shimura – (Japan/United States)
Good-bye, My Lady, directed by William A. Wellman, starring Brandon deWilde, Walter Brennan, Phil Harris
Great Day in the Morning, directed by Jacques Tourneur, starring Robert Stack and Virginia Mayo
The Great Locomotive Chase, starring Fess Parker and Jeffrey Hunter
The Great Man, directed by and starring José Ferrer, with Julie London, Keenan Wynn, Ed Wynn
The Green Man, starring Alastair Sim, George Cole, Terry-Thomas – (GB)
Gun the Man Down, starring James Arness and Angie Dickinson in her film debut
Gunslinger, directed by Roger Corman, starring John Ireland and Beverly Garland

H
The Harder They Fall, starring Humphrey Bogart in his final film
The Harvest Month (Elokuu) – (Finland)
Helen of Troy, starring Rossana Podestà, Stanley Baker
High Society, starring Bing Crosby, Frank Sinatra and Grace Kelly in her final film
Hilda Crane, starring Jean Simmons
Hold Back the Night, starring John Payne
Hollywood or Bust, starring Dean Martin and Jerry Lewis, with Anita Ekberg, in the final Martin and Lewis film
Hot Blood, starring Jane Russell and Cornel Wilde
The Houston Story, starring Barbara Hale and Gene Barry
The Hunchback of Notre Dame, starring Gina Lollobrigida and Anthony Quinn – (France/Italy)

I
Ich suche Dich (I Seek You), starring O. W. Fischer and Anouk Aimée – (West Germany)
The Indian Fighter, starring Kirk Douglas and Walter Matthau
Invasion of the Body Snatchers, directed by Don Siegel, starring Kevin McCarthy
Invitation to the Dance, directed by and starring Gene Kelly
It Conquered the World, directed by Roger Corman, starring Peter Graves and Beverly Garland

J
Jagte Raho (Stay Awake), starring Raj Kapoor – (India)
Johnny Concho, starring Frank Sinatra
Jubal, starring Glenn Ford, Rod Steiger, Ernest Borgnine, Felicia Farr, Charles Bronson
Julie, starring Doris Day and Louis Jourdan

K
Kanal, directed by Andrzej Wajda – (Poland)
The Killer Is Loose, directed by Budd Boetticher, starring Joseph Cotten, Rhonda Fleming, Wendell Corey
The Killers, a short film directed by Andrei Tarkovsky – (U.S.S.R.)
The Killing, directed by Stanley Kubrick, starring Sterling Hayden, Coleen Gray, Marie Windsor, Vince Edwards
The King and Four Queens, starring Clark Gable
The King and I, starring Deborah Kerr and Yul Brynner
A Kiss Before Dying, starring Robert Wagner and Joanne Woodward

L
The Last Hunt, directed by Richard Brooks, starring Robert Taylor and Stewart Granger
The Last Wagon, starring Richard Widmark
The Leech (Shabab emraa) – (Egypt)
The Lieutenant Wore Skirts, directed by Frank Tashlin, starring Tom Ewell and Sheree North
Lisbon, directed by and starring Ray Milland, with Maureen O'Hara and Claude Rains
The Lone Ranger, starring Clayton Moore and Jay Silverheels
The Long Arm, starring Jack Hawkins – (GB)
Love Me Tender, starring Elvis Presley in his film debut
Lust for Life, starring Kirk Douglas (as Vincent van Gogh) and Anthony Quinn

M
A Man Escaped (Un condamné à mort s'est échappé ou Le vent souffle où il veut), directed by Robert Bresson – (France)
The Man in the Gray Flannel Suit, starring Gregory Peck, Jennifer Jones, Fredric March, Keenan Wynn, Lee J. Cobb
Man on the Tracks (Człowiek na torze) – (Poland)
The Man Who Knew Too Much, directed by Alfred Hitchcock (a remake of his own 1934 British film), starring James Stewart and Doris Day
The Man Who Never Was, starring Clifton Webb and Gloria Grahame – (GB)
Marie Antoinette Queen of Francem directed by Jean Delannoy, starring Michèle Morgan and Richard Todd – (France)
The Maverick Queen, starring Barbara Stanwyck and Barry Sullivan
Meet Me in Las Vegas, starring Cyd Charisse
Merry-Go-Round (Körhinta) – (Hungary)
Michel Strogoff
Miracle in the Rain, starring Jane Wyman
Moby Dick, directed by John Huston, starring Gregory Peck, Richard Basehart, Leo Genn
Mukh O Mukhosh (The Face and the Mask) – (East Pakistan)

N
Naked Gun starring Mara Corday and Willard Parker
Nagareru (Flowing), directed by Mikio Naruse – (Japan)
Never Say Goodbye, starring Rock Hudson, David Janssen, Cornell Borchers
New Delhi – (India)

O
Old Khottabych (Starik Khottabych) – (U.S.S.R.)
On the Threshold of Space, starring Guy Madison
The Opposite Sex, starring June Allyson, Leslie Nielsen, Joan Collins
Othello, starring Sergei Bondarchuk – (U.S.S.R.)
Over-Exposed, starring Cleo Moore

P
Pardners, starring Dean Martin and Jerry Lewis
Patterns, starring Van Heflin and Ed Begley
Pillars of the Sky, starring Jeff Chandler and Dorothy Malone
Please Murder Me, starring Angela Lansbury and Raymond Burr
Poor but Handsome (Poveri ma belli) – (Italy)
The Power and the Prize, starring Robert Taylor, Burl Ives, Mary Astor, Cedric Hardwicke, Elisabeth Müller
Private's Progress, a Boulting Brothers film starring Ian Carmichael and Richard Attenborough – (GB)
Professor Hannibal (Hannibál tanár úr), directed by Zoltán Fábri (Hungary)
The Proud and Profane, starring William Holden and Deborah Kerr
The Proud Ones, starring Robert Ryan and Virginia Mayo

Q
Qivitoq – (Denmark)

R
The Rack, starring Paul Newman, Edmond O'Brien, Walter Pidgeon, Anne Francis, Lee Marvin, and Cloris Leachman
The Railroad Man (Il Ferroviere), directed by and starring Pietro Germi – (Italy)
The Rainmaker, starring Burt Lancaster, Katharine Hepburn, Lloyd Bridges and Wendell Corey
Raj Hath, starring Madhubala – (India)
Ransom!, starring Glenn Ford and Donna Reed
Reach for the Sky, a biopic of Douglas Bader starring Kenneth More – (GB)
The Red Balloon (Le Ballon rouge) – (France)
The Road of Life (El camino de la vida) – (Mexico)
Rock Around the Clock, featuring Bill Haley and His Comets
Rodan, directed by Ishirō Honda – (Japan)
The Roof (Il Tetto), directed by Vittorio De Sica – (Italy)
Run for the Sun, starring Richard Widmark, Trevor Howard, Jane Greer

S
Samurai III: Duel at Ganryu Island, directed by Hiroshi Inagaki, starring Toshiro Mifune – (Japan)
The Searchers, directed by John Ford, starring John Wayne, Jeffrey Hunter, Vera Miles, Ward Bond, Ken Curtis, Natalie Wood
Serenade, directed by Anthony Mann, starring Mario Lanza and Joan Fontaine
Seven Men from Now, directed by Budd Boetticher, starring Randolph Scott and Lee Marvin
Seven Wonders of the World, a documentary film directed by Tay Garnett and others
Seven Years in Tibet – (GB)
The She-Creature, starring Marla English
The Silent World, a marine documentary by Jacques-Yves Cousteau and Louis Malle – (France)
Sira` Fi al-Mina (a.k.a. Dark Water), directed by Youssef Chahine, starring Omar Sharif – (Egypt)
Slightly Scarlet, starring John Payne and Rhonda Fleming
The Solid Gold Cadillac, starring Judy Holliday
Somebody Up There Likes Me, starring Paul Newman
The Spanish Gardener, starring Dirk Bogarde – (GB)
The Square Jungle, starring Tony Curtis and Patricia Crowley
Star in the Dust, starring John Agar and Mamie Van Doren
Stars in Your Eyes – (GB)
Storm Center, starring Bette Davis and Kim Hunter
Street of Shame (Akasen chitai), directed by Kenji Mizoguchi – (Japan)

T
Tea and Sympathy, directed by Vincente Minnelli, starring Deborah Kerr and John Kerr
The Teahouse of the August Moon, starring Marlon Brando and Glenn Ford
The Ten Commandments, directed by Cecil B. DeMille, starring Charlton Heston, Yul Brynner, Anne Baxter, Yvonne De Carlo, Edward G. Robinson
There's Always Tomorrow, starring Barbara Stanwyck, Fred MacMurray, Joan Bennett
Three Brave Men, starring Ray Milland
Time Table, directed by and starring Mark Stevens, with Felicia Farr
Toward the Unknown, starring William Holden and Virginia Leith
A Town Like Alice, starring Virginia McKenna and Peter Finch – (GB)
Trapeze, directed by Carol Reed, starring Burt Lancaster, Tony Curtis, Gina Lollobrigida
Tribute to a Bad Man, directed by Robert Wise, starring James Cagney, Irene Papas, Stephen McNally, Don Dubbins, Vic Morrow
The Twelve Months (Dvenadtsat mesyatsev) – (USSR)

U
Uncle Hyacynth (Mi tío Jacinto) – (Spain)

V
Valley of Peace (Dolina miru) – (Yugoslavia)
I Vampiri (The Vampire) – (Italy)

W
War and Peace, directed by King Vidor, starring Audrey Hepburn, Henry Fonda, Mel Ferrer, Anita Ekberg
Wakeful Eyes, directed by Ezz El-Dine Zulficar, starring Salah Zulfikar and Shadia – (Egypt)
What a Woman!, starring Sophia Loren, Charles Boyer and Marcello Mastroianni – (Italy)
While the City Sleeps, starring Dana Andrews, Ida Lupino, Rhonda Fleming, George Sanders, Vincent Price
Who Done It?, starring Benny Hill – (GB)
A Woman's Devotion, starring Ralph Meeker and Janice Rule
Written on the Wind, directed by Douglas Sirk, starring Rock Hudson, Lauren Bacall, Robert Stack, Dorothy Malone
The Wrong Man, directed by Alfred Hitchcock, starring Henry Fonda and Vera Miles

X
X the Unknown, starring Dean Jagger and Leo McKern – (GB)

Y
Yield to the Night, starring Diana Dors – (GB)
You Can't Run Away from It, directed by Dick Powell, starring June Allyson and Jack Lemmon

Z
Zarak, starring Victor Mature – (GB)

Serials
Blazing the Overland Trail, starring Lee Roberts and Dennis Moore
Perils of the Wilderness

Short film series 
 Looney Tunes (1930–1969)
 Terrytoons (1930–1964)
 Merrie Melodies (1931–1969)
 Popeye (1933–1957)
 The Three Stooges (1934–1959)
 Bugs Bunny (1940–1962)
 Tom and Jerry (1940–1958)
 Droopy (1943–1958)
 Yosemite Sam (1945–1963)
 Speedy Gonzales (1953–1968)

Ending this year
 Donald Duck (1934-1956)
 Chip 'n' Dale (1943-1956)

Births 
 January 1 - Sheila McCarthy, Canadian actress and singer
 January 3 – Mel Gibson, American Irish actor and director
 January 7 – David Caruso, American actor
 January 9 
Imelda Staunton, English actress
Kimberly Beck, American actress
January 13 - Janet Hubert, American actress
 January 21
Geena Davis, American actress
Robby Benson, American actor
 January 22 - Michael Kopsa, Canadian actor (d. 2022)
 January 25 – Dinah Manoff, American actress and director
 January 27
Susan Blakeslee, American voice actress and musical theatre actress
Mimi Rogers, American actress
 January 30 - Ann Dowd, American actress
 February 3 – Nathan Lane, American actor
 February 13 - Jimmy Yuill, Scottish actor
 February 14 - Tom Burlinson, Canadian-Australian actor and singer
 February 17 – Richard Karn, American actor
 February 19 – Kathleen Beller, American actress
 February 26 - Jonathan Schmock, American actor, director, producer and writer
 February 28 – Lloyd Sherr, American voice actor
 March 1 – Tim Daly, American actor
 March 7 – Bryan Cranston, American actor and director
 March 8 - John Kapelos, Canadian actor
 March 11 – Rob Paulsen, American voice actor
 March 12 – Lesley Manville, English Actress
 March 13 – Dana Delany, American actress
 March 16 - Clifton Powell, American actor
 March 25 - Matthew Garber, British actor and filmmaker (d. 1977)
 March 26 – Erika Kaljusaar, Estonian actress
 March 30 - Paul Reiser, American comedian, actor and musician
 April 8 - Jim Piddock, English actor, producer and writer
 April 12 – Andy García, Cuban-American actor
 April 14 - Chris Ellis (actor), American character actor
 April 17 - Vyto Ruginis, English actor and producer
 April 18 – Eric Roberts, American actor
 April 22 - Bruce A. Young, American actor, writer and screenwriter
 April 27 - Kevin McNally, English actor and writer
 April 30 – Lars von Trier, Danish director
 May 5 – Lisa Eilbacher, American actress
 May 7 – S. Scott Bullock, American voice actor
 May 9 – Wendy Crewson, Canadian actress
 May 10
Paige O'Hara, American actress, voice actress, singer and painter
Jonathan Roberts, American screenwriter, producer and author
 May 12 – Kimiko Yo, Japanese actress
 May 13 - Fred Melamed, American actor, comedian and writer
 May 17 - Bob Saget, American stand-up comedian, actor and television host (d. 2022)
 May 19 - Steven Ford, American actor
 June 4 – Keith David, American actor
 June 5 - Roger Michell, British director (d. 2021)
 June 11 - Tim Russ, American actor, director, screenwriter and musician
 June 25 - Chloe Webb, American actress
 June 30 - David Alan Grier, American actor, singer and comedian
 July 1 – Alan Ruck, American actor
 July 2 - Jerry Hall, American actress and model
 July 9 – Tom Hanks, American actor and director
 July 11 – Sela Ward, American actress
 July 19 - Peter Barton (actor), American retired actor
 July 25 - Roger Clinton Jr., American actor and musician
 July 31
Michael Biehn, American actor
R. A. Mihailoff, American actor
 August 10 - Peter Robbins (actor), American child actor (d. 2022) 
 August 12 – Bruce Greenwood, Canadian actor
 August 20 – Joan Allen, American actress
 August 21 – Kim Cattrall, English-born Canadian actress
 August 24 - Kevin Dunn, American actor
 August 28 – Luis Guzman, Puerto Rican character actor
 September 5 - Debbie Turner, American actress
 September 7 - Michael Beattie (actor), Canadian-American actor
 September 11 - Tony Gilroy, American filmmaker
 September 16 - Jimmy Chisholm, Scottish actor
 September 18 - Tim McInnerny, English actor
 September 20 – Gary Cole, American actor
 September 26 – Linda Hamilton, American actress
 September 28 - Kiran Shah, Kenyan-Indian actor and stunt double
 September 29 - Stuart Charno, American actor
 October 2 - Charlie Adler, American voice actor and voice director
 October 3 - Hart Bochner, Canadian actor, director, screenwriter and producer
 October 4 – Christoph Waltz, Austrian-German actor
 October 10 - Amanda Burton, Northern Irish actress
 October 14 - Bruce MacVittie, American actor (d. 2022)
 October 20 – Danny Boyle, English director and producer
 October 21 – Carrie Fisher, American actress (d. 2016)
 October 26 – Rita Wilson, American actress and producer
 October 30 - Juliet Stevenson, English actress
 November 3 - Gary Ross, American director, writer and producer
 November 8 – Richard Curtis, New Zealand-born British director and screenwriter
 November 10
Matt Craven, Canadian character actor
Sinbad (comedian), American stand-up comedian and actor
 November 13 - Rex Linn, American actor
 November 17 - Kelly Ward, American actor and voice director
 November 20 – Bo Derek, American actress and model
 November 22 – Richard Kind, American actor and voice actor
 November 26 - Don Lake, Canadian actor and writer
 November 27 - William Fichtner, American actor
 December 2 - Steven Bauer, Cuban-born American actor
 December 7 - Mark Rolston, American character actor
 December 10 - Catherine Parks, American actress
 December 17 – Peter Farrelly, American film director
 December 20 - Blanche Baker, American actress and filmmaker

Deaths 
 January 9 – Marion Leonard, 74, American early silent actress, The Prussian Spy, The Gibson Goddess
 January 12 – Norman Kerry, 61, American actor, The Phantom of the Opera, The Unknown
 January 19 – Charles Dingle, 68, American actor, Call Me Madam, State of the Union
 January 23 – Alexander Korda, 62, Hungarian film director, the founder of London Films, That Hamilton Woman, The Private Life of Henry VIII
 February 2 
Bob Burns, 65, American actor, Waikiki Wedding, Belle of the Yukon
Charley Grapewin, 86, American actor, The Wizard of Oz, The Grapes of Wrath 
 February 26 – Elsie Janis, 66, American actress and screenwriter, A Regular Girl, Women in War
 March 17 – Fred Allen, 61, American actor, It's in the Bag!, O. Henry's Full House
 March 25 – Robert Newton, 50, English actor, Oliver Twist, Odd Man Out
 April 4 – Lloyd Ingraham, 81, American actor and director, Scaramouche, West of the Rio Grande
 April 14 – Christian Rub, 70, Austrian actor, Father's Son, Something for the Birds
 April 15 – Kathleen Howard, 71, Canadian-American opera singer and actress, It's a Gift, Ball of Fire
 April 21 – Charles MacArthur, 60, American screenwriter and playwright, Wuthering Heights, His Girl Friday
 April 24 – Henry Stephenson, 85, British actor, Mutiny on the Bounty, Oliver Twist
 April 26 – Edward Arnold, 66, American actor, Mr. Smith Goes to Washington, Diamond Jim
 May 12 – Louis Calhern, 61, American actor, Duck Soup, Notorious, The Asphalt Jungle, High Society
 June 2 – Jean Hersholt, 69, Danish-American actor, Heidi
 June 6 – Margaret Wycherly, 74, English-American actress, White Heat, Sergeant York
 June 30 – Thorleif Lund, 76, Norwegian actor, Skibsrotten, Republikaneren
 July 8 – Mona Mårtenson, 54, Swedish actress, Pippi Longstocking, The Saga of Gosta Berling
 July 16 – Olof Winnerstrand, 80, Swedish actor, Torment, A Lesson in Love
 August 16 – Bela Lugosi, 73, Hungarian-born American actor, Dracula, White Zombie, The Black Cat
 August 23 – Kenji Mizoguchi, 58, Japanese director, The Life of Oharu, A Geisha
 October 2 – George Bancroft, 74, American actor, Stagecoach, Mr. Deeds Goes to Town
 October 9 – Marie Doro, 74, American actress, Oliver Twist, Sally Bishop
 October 17 – Anne Crawford, 35, British actress, Knights of the Round Table, Night Beat
 November 6 – Paul Kelly, 57, American actor, Juvenile Court, Adventure in Sahara
 November 10 – Victor Young, 56, American composer, Around the World in 80 Days, For Whom the Bell Tolls
 November 26 – Tommy Dorsey, 56, American musician, The Fabulous Dorseys, DuBarry Was a Lady, Ship Ahoy
 November 30 – Viggo Wiehe, 81, Danish actor, Doctor Nicholson and the Blue Diamond, Røverne fra Rold
 December 8 – Jack Cohn, 67, co-founder of Columbia Pictures
 December 12 – E. A. Dupont, 64, German writer, director, Jealousy, The Scarf
 December 26 – Holmes Herbert, 74, British actor, Dr. Jekyll and Mr. Hyde, The Invisible Man

Film Debuts 
Jean-Paul Belmondo – Molière
Michael Caine – Panic in the Parlor
Frank Campanella – Somebody Up There Likes Me
James Garner – Toward the Unknown
Rance Howard – Frontier Woman
Ron Howard – Frontier Woman
Glenda Jackson – The Extra Day
Dean Jones – Somebody Up There Likes Me
Robert Loggia – Somebody Up There Likes Me
Michael Lonsdale – It Happened in Aden
Donald Moffat – The Battle of the River Plate
Robert Morse – The Proud and Profane
Leslie Nielsen – Ransom!
Joan Plowright – Moby Dick
Elvis Presley – Love Me Tender
Salah Zulfikar – Wakeful Eyes
Maggie Smith – Child in the House
Harry Dean Stanton – The Wrong Man
Rip Torn – Baby Doll
Cicely Tyson – Carib Gold
Robert Vaughn – The Ten Commandments
John Vernon – 1984
Eli Wallach – Baby Doll
Tuesday Weld – Rock, Rock, Rock

Notes

References 

 
Film by year